The 1997 ABN AMRO World Tennis Tournament was a men's tennis tournament played on indoor carpet courts at Rotterdam Ahoy in the Netherlands. It was part of the World Series of the 1997 ATP Tour. The tournament ran from 3 March through 9 March 1997. Richard Krajicek won the singles title.
 
The singles draw featured ATP No. 5, 1996 Grand Slam Cup runner-up, Moscow and Zagreb titlist and Rotterdam defending champion Goran Ivanišević, reigning Wimbledon champion Richard Krajicek and Paris, Stockholm and Marseille winner Thomas Enqvist. Also seeded were New Haven and Vienna finalist Jan Siemerink, Hamburg, Kitzbühel and Marbella runner-up Àlex Corretja, Paul Haarhuis, Cédric Pioline and Petr Korda.

Finals

Men's singles

 Richard Krajicek defeated  Daniel Vacek  7–6(7–4), 7–6(7–5)
 It was Krajicek's 1st title of the year and the 14th of his career.

Men's doubles

 Jacco Eltingh /  Paul Haarhuis defeated  Libor Pimek /  Byron Talbot 7–6, 6–4
 It was Eltingh's 2nd title of the year and the 34th of his career. It was Haarhuis' 2nd title of the year and the 33rd of his career.

References

External links
 Official website 
 Official website 
 ATP tournament profile
 ITF tournament edition details

 
ABN AMRO World Tennis Tournament
ABN AMRO World Tennis Tournament
ABN AMRO World Tennis Tournament